Clifford Eugene Levingston (born January 4, 1961) is an American professional basketball coach and former player.

Professional playing career

A former power forward, Levingston played in the National Basketball Association (NBA). Levingston starred at Wichita State University, before being drafted by the Detroit Pistons in the 1982 NBA draft. After two seasons with the Pistons, he was traded to the Atlanta Hawks, with whom he would spend most of his career.

In 1986, while playing for the Hawks, Levingston had the rare distinction of "fouling into" an NBA game. In a game where Dominique Wilkins and Antoine Carr were injured, Kevin Willis, Scott Hastings, Jon Koncak, Spud Webb, and Levingston fouled out of the game. After Doc Rivers was ejected, the Hawks were down to only four players. Under NBA Rule 3-I-b, Levingston, the last player to foul out, was allowed to come back into the game, under the player foul penalty situation, resulting in a non-unsportsmanlike conduct technical foul.

After six seasons with the Hawks, Levingston joined the Chicago Bulls, with whom he won two championship rings in 1991 and 1992. From 1992 to 1994, he played with PAOK of the Greek Basket League, and as such he played in the final four of FIBA European League (now called EuroLeague). In 1993, he moved to Virtus Bologna of the Italian Serie A, where he won the national title in 1994. In 1994, he returned to the United States, and joined the Denver Nuggets. He retired from the league in 1995, with career totals of 5,888 points, 4,307 rebounds, and 593 blocked shots.

Coaching career
In 2000, Levingston began his coaching career as an assistant basketball coach with the Fort Wayne Fury of the CBA. In 2001, he served as an assistant coach with the Dodge City Legend of the USBL. In 2002, he returned to Dodge City, to serve his first stint as a professional league head coach; that year the Legends won the USBL title, and Levingston was named the USBL Coach of the Year.

From 2003 to 2004, Levingston served as an assistant coach for the Harlem Globetrotters. In 2004, he coached the St. Louis Flight of the ABA.

In 2005, Levingston was hired as an assistant coach of the Gary Steelheads of the CBA; that year, the Steelheads played their best season in franchise history, though they lost the championship game. In 2006, he briefly served as an assistant coach for the Kansas Cagerz, and in November, he was officially hired by the Gary Steelheads (of the USBL), as head coach for the 2007 season.

In the fall of 2007, Micheal Ray Richardson was fired by the Oklahoma Cavalry of the CBA. Levingston was hired to replace him.

In the fall of 2011, Levingston became an assistant coach for Michigan City Marquette High School, in northern Indiana.

In 2012, Levingston was named the 2nd head coach of the Rochester Razorsharks of the Premier Basketball League. He coached the Sharks for one season.

In 2020, Levingston was named the 1st head coach of the Kokomo BobKats of the TBL.

Personal life
In 2003, Levingston was sentenced to four months in prison, for failure to pay child support.

Levingston is a cousin of NBA player Cory Carr.

Levingston is also a cousin of retired MLB player Mark McLemore.

References

External links

1961 births
Living people
20th-century African-American sportspeople
21st-century African-American people
African-American basketball players
American expatriate basketball people in Greece
American expatriate basketball people in Italy
American men's basketball coaches
American men's basketball players
Atlanta Hawks players
Basketball coaches from California
Basketball players from San Diego
Chicago Bulls players
Continental Basketball Association coaches
Denver Nuggets players
Detroit Pistons draft picks
Detroit Pistons players
P.A.O.K. BC players
Power forwards (basketball)
United States Basketball League coaches
Virtus Bologna players
Wichita State Shockers men's basketball players